Philippe Forest (born 18 June 1962) is a French author and professor of literature. He has been awarded the First Novel Prix Femina (1997) and the Prix Décembre (2004), and his works have been translated into English, Italian, Spanish, Japanese, Korean, and Chinese. He has taught at several Universities, including Cambridge, Edinburgh, and Saint-Andrews, and the University of Nantes.

Publications

Novels, French
 L'enfant éternel (Prix Femina), Gallimard, 1997; Folio, 1998
 Toute la nuit, Gallimard, 1999
 Sarinagara (Prix Décembre), Gallimard 2004; Folio, 2006
 Le Nouvel Amour, Gallimard, 2007
 Le siècle des nuages, Gallimard, 2010

Novels, translated
 Sarinagara, Mercury House, 2009 

Essays
Philippe Sollers, Seuil, 1992
Camus, Marabout, 1992
Le Mouvement surréaliste, Vuibert, 1994
Textes et labyrinthes : Joyce, Kafka, Muir, Borges, Butor, Robbe-Grillet, éd. Inter-universitaires, 1995
Histoire de Tel Quel, Seuil, 1995
Oé Kenzaburô, Pleins Feux, 2001
Le roman, le je, Pleins Feux, 2001
Près des acacias, l'autisme, une énigme (avec des photos d'Olivier Menanteau), Actes Sud/ 3CA, 2002
Raymond Hains, uns roman, Gallimard 2004
La beauté du contresens et autres essais sur la littérature japonaise (Allaphbed 1), Cécile Defaut, 2005
De Tel Quel à L'Infini, nouveaux essais (Allaphbed 2), Cécile Defaut, 2006
Le Roman, le réel et autres essais (Allaphbed 3), Cécile Defaut, 2007 
 Tous les enfants sauf un, Gallimard, 2007

External links 
"French Literature Today: Philippe Forest in conversation with Yann Nicol" in The Brooklyn Rail, April 2006.

20th-century French essayists
21st-century French essayists
Sciences Po alumni
Paris-Sorbonne University alumni
Academics of the University of Cambridge
Academics of the University of St Andrews
Academics of the University of London
Academic staff of the University of Nantes
Officiers of the Ordre des Arts et des Lettres
Prix Décembre winners
Writers from Paris
1962 births
Living people
Nouvelle Revue Française editors